Bothynotrechus is a genus of beetles in the family Carabidae, containing the following species:

 Bothynotrechus castelnaui (Sloane, 1920)
 Bothynotrechus lynx Moore, 1972

References

Trechinae